Þórhildur Sunna Ævarsdóttir (born 6 May 1987 in Akranes) is an Icelandic politician, human rights lawyer and journalist, who represents the Pirate Party.

She has a Master of Laws from the University of Utrecht in international human rights and criminal law. After her studies she became an intern at the International Court of Justice in the Hague, did legal volunteer work and worked as a freelance journalist for the Icelandic web portals kvennabladid.is and grapevine.is.

In 2016–2017 Þórhildur was chairman of the Pirate Party, which is an organizational post. She was elected to the Althing in 2016 for the Southwest Constituency. In 2017 she was selected as the spokesperson for the Pirates, a position that makes her the public face of the party, which does not have a formal leader.

External links 
 Personal website 
 Profile on the Pirate Party website

References 

Thorhildur Sunna Aevarsdottir
Thorhildur Sunna Aevarsdottir
Thorhildur Sunna Aevarsdottir
Thorhildur Sunna Aevarsdottir
Thorhildur Sunna Aevarsdottir
1987 births
Living people
21st-century Icelandic lawyers